The 1917 Camp Funston football team represented the United States Army's 89th Infantry Division based at Camp Funston, Fort Riley, near Manhattan, Kansas, during the 1917 college football season. The team was coached by Paul Withington, who had been the head coach at Wisconsin in 1916.

The team's leading players included Potsy Clark and Adrian Lindsey.

Schedule

References

Camp Funston
Camp Funston football